is a Japanese football player. He plays for Yokohama F. Marinos.

Career
Kota Watanabe joined J2 League club Tokyo Verdy in 2016.

International career
On May 24, 2019, Watanabe has been called by Japan's head coach Hajime Moriyasu to feature in the Copa América played in Brazil. He's the only J2 League player to be called-up for this competition.

Club statistics
Updated to 5 November 2022.

Honours

Club
Yokohama F. Marinos
J1 League (2): 2019, 2022

References

External links
Profile at Tokyo Verdy

1998 births
Living people
Association football people from Kanagawa Prefecture
Japanese footballers
J2 League players
J1 League players
Tokyo Verdy players
Yokohama F. Marinos players
Association football midfielders
Footballers at the 2018 Asian Games
Asian Games silver medalists for Japan
Asian Games medalists in football
Medalists at the 2018 Asian Games